Sadovy is a rural locality (a settlement) in Svetloyarsky District, Volgograd Oblast, Russia. The population was 53 as of 2010.

References 

Rural localities in Svetloyarsky District